Paule is a commune in the Côtes-d'Armor department in Brittany in northwestern France.

Population

Inhabitants of Paule are called paulois in French.

Geography

Historically, the village belongs to Cornouaille. Paule is border by Le Moustoir and Maël-Carhaix to the north, by Glomel to the east, by Langonnet to the south and by Plévin to the west. From the hamlet of Bellevue, it is possible to enjoy a nice view on the plain toward the north.

Map

Prehistory

The fortified habitat of Paule, a protohistoric Celtic fortress commonly called the fortress of Paule, dates from the 5th century BC. J.-C. to the 1st century AD. J.-C., on the territory of the Osismes.

See also
 Communes of the Côtes-d'Armor department

References

External links

 Paule web site
 

Communes of Côtes-d'Armor